Alexandra Beauvoir Cheron Tavárez (January 16, 1983 – May 21, 2011) was a Dominican-American actress, model, businesswoman, and socialite. 

Tavárez was born in the Dominican Republic. Her father was an accountant from Haiti and her mother an ambassador in the United States for the Dominican Republic. Alexandra grew up in Haiti until 1999, when she moved to Florida.

Selected filmography
Miami Vice as Nurse (2006)
After Sex as Jennifer (2007)
Redline as Model (2007)
A Raisin in the Sun as Anna (2008)
This Is Not A Test as Woman at the Counter (2008)
The Game as Rebecca (2 episodes, 2007–2008)
Fast & Furious as Sylvia (2009)
Mama, I Want to Sing! as Kimberly (2011)

References

External links 

 

Dominican Republic emigrants to the United States
American television actresses
Female models from Florida
1983 births
2011 deaths
American film actresses
People from San Francisco de Macorís
Dominican Republic people of Haitian descent
Actresses from Florida
21st-century American actresses